The Praemium Imperiale is an international art prize inaugurated in 1988 and awarded since 1989 by the Imperial family of Japan on behalf of the Japan Art Association in the fields of painting, sculpture, architecture, music, and theatre/film.

The prize consists of a gold medal and 15 million Japanese yen, and was created by the Fujisankei Communications Group, which pays the expenses of around $3 million per year. The prizes are awarded for outstanding contributions to the development, promotion and progress of the arts.

Information

The Praemium Imperiale is awarded in the memory of Prince Takamatsu (1905–1987), younger brother of Emperor Shōwa who reigned from 1926 through 1989. Prince Takamatsu was famous for his longtime support of the development, promotion and progress of arts in the world.

The laureates are announced each September; the prize presentation ceremony and related events are held in Tokyo, Japan, each November. The prize presentation ceremony is held in the presence of His Imperial Highness Prince Hitachi, President of the Japan Art Association, at the Meiji Kinenkan in Tokyo. Prince Hitachi presents the prizes to the selected laureates. The prize consists of a gold medal and 15 million Japanese yen, and was created by the Fujisankei Communications Group, which pays the expenses of around $3 million per year.

The laureates are annually recommended by international advisers, and decided by an anonymous committee of the Japan Art Association. The advisers include Yasuhiro Nakasone, William H. Luers, Lamberto Dini, François Pinault, Chris Patten, and Klaus-Dieter Lehmann. Honorary advisers included Jacques Chirac, David Rockefeller, David Rockefeller Jr., Helmut Schmidt and Richard von Weizsäcker.

Table of laureates

Grants for Young Artists
Since 1997, a series of grants have been made to organizations which  nourish young artists.
 2021 The Advanced Training School of the Central Institute for Restoration, Italy
 2019 Démos (Philharmonie de Paris)
 2018 Shakespeare Schools Foundation
 2017 Zoukak Theatre Company and Cultural Association, Lebanon
 2016 Five Arts |Centre, Malaysia
 2015 Yangon Film School, Myanmar/Germany
 2014 The Zinsou Foundation, Benin
 2013 The JuniOrchestra of Accademia Nazionale di Santa Cecilia in Rome
 2012 The Sphinx Organization, USA
 2011 Southbank Sinfonia and The Royal Court Young Writers Programme
 2010 Asian Youth Orchestra
 2009 Kremerata Baltica, Latvia/Lithuania/Estonia
 2008 Italian Youth Orchestra, Italy
 2007 West-Eastern Divan Orchestra
 2006 State Foundation of the National Network of Youth and Children Orchestras of Venezuela (El Sistema)
 2005 Kusatsu International Summer Music Academy, Japan
 2004 Young Sound Forum of Central Europe
 2003 De Sono Associazione per la Musica, Italy
 2002 European Union Youth Orchestra
 2001 Résidence du Festival, France
 2000 Ulster Youth Orchestra, Northern Ireland
 1999 Instituto Superior de Arte, Cuba
 1998 Polish National Film, Television and Theater School, Poland
 1997 Hanoi Conservatory of Music, Vietnam

See also
 Fuji Television
 Sankei Shimbun

References

External links
Official website

Awards established in 1988
Academic awards
International awards
Visual arts awards
International film awards
International music awards
Architecture awards
Sculpture awards
International theatre awards
Japanese awards